Châtelaillon-Plage (also ), commonly known as Châtelaillon,  is a commune in the Charente-Maritime department, administrative region of Nouvelle-Aquitaine, France.

It is located south of the city of La Rochelle and is also a suburb. It is twinned with Knebworth, England.

History
In the 16th century near the point of Cornard today featured a fortress known as Castrum Allionis, the old capital of Aunis.  On August 1130, the Duke of Aquitaine William X of Poitiers, besieged the château.  The leader of the place Isembert deprived its troops.  The rest of the fortress were totally despaired in the 16th century, a small hamlet with bells of the swamps.  During the 19th century, it had agricultural area in Boucholeurs.  At the end of the nineteenth century, it was linked with rail, it constructed its first baths bains de mar with numerous villas.

Today, the location of the mediaeval château is uncertain, it may also located by the Turge.

Education
École maternelle et élementaire Pierre Jonchery (Pierre Jonchery Maternal and Elementary School)
École maternelle Les Sables
École élémentaire Paul Michaud (Paul Michaud Elementary School)
Collège André Malraux
CIPECMA (Centre Interconsulaire de Perfectionnement et d'Enseignement de la Charente-Maritime).

International relations

Châtelaillon is twinned with Knebworth, Hertfordshire, England, and Evolène, Wallis, Switzerland, and Skierniewice, Łódź, Poland.

Population

See also
 Communes of the Charente-Maritime department

References

External links
 

Communes of Charente-Maritime
Arrondissement of La Rochelle
Aunis
Charente-Maritime communes articles needing translation from French Wikipedia